Jonas Engström (born 21 January 1991) is a Swedish professional ice hockey winger who currently plays for the IK Oskarshamn in the Swedish Hockey League (SHL).

Playing career
He made his professional debut with hometown club, Södertälje SK, in the Elitserien during the 2009–10 season.

In the 2018–19 season, his fourth year as Captain of IK Oskarshamn in the HockeyAllsvenskan, Engström notched a career best 15 goals and 37 points in 52 games. He led Oskarshamn in the SHL Qualifiers, posting 8 points in 12 games to help promote Oskarshamn to the SHL for the first time in franchise history.

On 17 April 2019, Engström left Oskarshamn as a free agent, securing a two-year SHL contract with the Växjö Lakers.

References

External links

1991 births
Living people
IK Oskarshamn players
Södertälje SK players
HC Vita Hästen players
Swedish ice hockey left wingers
People from Södertälje
Sportspeople from Stockholm County
21st-century Swedish people